The India cricket team toured England in August and September 2021 to play five Test matches. Prior to their matches against England, India played New Zealand in the 2021 ICC World Test Championship Final at the Rose Bowl in Southampton in June 2021. The Test series were the first matches of the 2021–2023 ICC World Test Championship.

In May 2021, the Board of Control for Cricket in India (BCCI) made a request to the England and Wales Cricket Board (ECB) to adjust the schedule of the tour to accommodate the remaining matches of the 2021 Indian Premier League. However, a change would impact on tickets that have already been sold and the need to reschedule matches in The Hundred. On the second day of the third Test, England players wore black armbands in remembrance of former England cricketer Ted Dexter, who died on 25 August 2021. Likewise, on the first day of the fourth Test, Indian players wore black armbands in remembrance of former Indian cricketer Vasoo Paranjape, who died on 30 August 2021.

The first Test of the series ended in a draw, after more than two days of play was lost across the duration of the match to rain. India won the second Test by 151 runs, in the final hour of the fifth day, to take a 1–0 lead in the series. England won the third Test by an innings and 76 runs before the lunch break on day four, levelling the series 1–1. It was Joe Root's 27th win as captain, the most by a captain of England in Test cricket. India won the fourth Test by 157 runs, to lead the series 2–1 with one match to play.

On the morning of the scheduled start of the fifth Test of the series, both cricket boards confirmed that the match would not start on 10 September 2021, following positive COVID-19 results in the Indian team. The ECB then issued a statement to say that the Test match had been cancelled, as India were unable to field a side. Clarification on the result of the series was sent to the International Cricket Council (ICC), and the match referee Chris Broad. The BCCI issued a statement saying that they were working with the ECB with the aim to reschedule the match. In September 2021, the ECB announced that India would play a one-off Test match in 2022, ahead of India's limited-overs matches against England. The following month, the ECB confirmed that the rescheduled match would determine the outcome of the Test series. After being set a target of 378 runs, England won the fifth Test by seven wickets to record their highest successful run chase in a Test match, with the five-match series being drawn 2–2.

Squads

India also named Abhimanyu Easwaran, Prasidh Krishna, Avesh Khan, and Arzan Nagwaswalla as standby players. In May 2021, K. S. Bharat was added to India's squad as cover for Wriddhiman Saha. On 6 July 2021, the BCCI requested that Shubman Gill returned to India after suffering with a stress injury. Prior to the warm-up matches, Rishabh Pant tested positive for COVID-19, and did not travel with the Indian squad to Durham, with Pant remaining in quarantine. After Pant's positive test, four more of India's contingent also tested positive and were quarantined in London for ten days. On 21 July 2021, the ECB announced the 17 member squad for the first two Test matches. On 22 July 2021, Avesh Khan and Washington Sundar were both ruled out of India's squad due to injury. On 25 July 2021, Prithvi Shaw and Suryakumar Yadav were announced as replacements for Gill, Khan, and Sundar. Abhimanyu Easwaran was also added to India's main squad from the group of reserve players. Mayank Agarwal was ruled out of India's squad for the first Test after suffering a concussion during a training session. Prasidh Krishna, one of India's standby players, was added to the main squad for the fourth Test match.

On 30 July 2021, England's Ben Stokes announced that he would be taking an "indefinite break" from all cricket with immediate effect. Craig Overton was added to England's squad as his replacement. Ahead of the second Test, Moeen Ali was added to England's squad. Saqib Mahmood was also added to England's squad for the second Test, as cover for James Anderson and Stuart Broad. Stuart Broad was later ruled out of the rest of the series after suffering a tear to his right calf. Dom Bess and Ollie Pope were both released from England's squad, allowing them to play in the 2021 Royal London One-Day Cup. Dawid Malan was added to England's squad for the third Test, replacing Dom Sibley. Ollie Pope was recalled to the squad for the match, with Zak Crawley being released. Jack Leach was not included in England's squad, but remained on standby for Moeen Ali. Mark Wood was ruled out of England's squad for the third Test after suffering a shoulder injury in the previous match. Wood and Chris Woakes were recalled to England's squad for the fourth Test. Jos Buttler missed the match due the birth of his second child, with Jonny Bairstow keeping wicket, Sam Billings added as wicket-keeper cover. Moeen Ali was also named as the vice-captain for the match. Saqib Mahmood was released from the squad, allowing him to play in the 2021 County Championship for Lancashire. Billings was released from England's squad during the fourth Test, to play in the 2021 County Championship for Kent. Jos Buttler and Jack Leach were both recalled for the fifth Test.

In January 2022, following India's third Test match against South Africa, Virat Kohli announced that he had stepped down as India's captain in Test cricket. On 22 May 2022, the BCCI named their squad for the rescheduled match against England, with Rohit Sharma leading the Test side. In June 2022, Mayank Agarwal was added to India's squad for the fifth Test, after Rohit Sharma tested positive for COVID-19. On 29 June 2022, Rohit Sharma again tested positive for COVID-19, with him undertaking two further tests to confirm his availability for the fifth Test. KL Rahul was ruled out of India's squad for the fifth Test after undergoing surgery for a hernia. Sharma was ruled out of the match, with Jasprit Bumrah named as India's captain and Rishabh Pant as the team's vice-captain.

On 27 June 2022, shortly after the conclusion of the series against New Zealand, England confirmed their squad for the fifth Test. Ben Foakes was ruled out of the match after failing to recover from COVID-19.

Warm-up match
Ahead of the Test series, India were scheduled to play two intra-squad warm-up matches against India A. However, due to the COVID-19 pandemic, the England and Wales Cricket Board (ECB) confirmed that India would play two intra-squad four-day matches instead, with India travelling with a larger squad. Two first-class matches were planned against county teams, but were initially replaced with intra-squad matches in Durham. On 14 July 2021, both cricket boards agreed to a three-day match against a County Select XI side as part of India's preparation for the Test series. Will Rhodes of Warwickshire was named as the captain of the County Select XI team.

Test series

1st Test

2nd Test

3rd Test

4th Test

5th Test

Notes

References

External links
 Series home at ESPN Cricinfo

2021 in English cricket
2021 in Indian cricket
International cricket competitions in 2021
Indian cricket tours of England
Cricket events curtailed due to the COVID-19 pandemic